World Qualification Series (WQS) is a surfing points competition for the honour of competing with the world's best surfers on the ASP World Tour. The WQS is sometimes referred to as 'The Grind' or simply the 'QS' by competitors.

History

The WQS was introduced in 1992 as a feeder competition to what was then called the WCT (World Championship Tour). The top scoring fifteen surfers on the WQS replaced the lowest scoring seventeen from the WCT on the following year's tour.

2009 Competition

Event 1: O'Neill Sebastian Inlet Pro (4*)
Jan 12 - Jan 18

Winner: Nathaniel Curran

Event 2: Copa Movistar (2*)
Jan 23 - Jan 25

Winner: Rafael Pereira

Event 3: Hang Loose Pro (5*)
Feb 09 - Feb15

Winner: Bruno Santos

Event 4: MR Pro (2*)
Mar 18 - Mar 22

Winner: Travis Logie

Event 5: O'Neill Coldwater Classic - Tasmania (6*)
Mar 23 - Mar 29

Winner : Jordy Smith

Event 6: Van's Pier Classic (2*)
Mar 25 - Mar 29

Winner : Mike Losness

Event 7: Drug Aware Pro (6P*)
Mar 29 - Apr 05

Winner : Daniel Ross()

Event 8: Vendee Surf Pro (5*)
Apr 06 - Apr 12

Winner : Joan Duru

Event 9: Goanna Pro (1*)
Apr 10 - Apr 12

CANCELLED

Event 10: Quiksilver Pro Durban (6P*)
Apr 19 - Apr 26

Winner: Andre Jadson

Event 11: Estoril Coast Pro (6*)
Apr 21 - Apr 26

Winner: Alejo Muniz

Event 12: 6.0 Lower's Pro (6P*)
Apr 28 - May 02

Winner : Fredrick Pattacchia

Event 13: O'Neill Coldwater Classic - Scotland (6P*)
Apr 29 - May 06

Winner : Adam Melling

Event 14: Lizzard Nandos Surf Pro (1*)
May 14 - May 17

Winner : Royden Bryson

Event 15: Macy's E'Series - Sandy Beach, Oahu (1*)
May 12 - May 17

Winner : TJ Barron

Event 16: Arica Pro Challenge (3*)
Jun 02 - Jun 07

Winner : Gabriel Villarán

Event 17: SriLankan Airlines Pro (6P*)
Jun 08 - Jun 14

Winner : Owen Wright

Event 18: O'Neill Coldwater Classic - South Africa (6P*)
Jun 16 - Jun 24

Winner : Blake Thornton

Event 19: The Mr Price Pro (6*)
Jun 28 - Jul 05

Event 20: Super Bock Pro (1*)
Jul 09 - Jul 12

Event 21: Maresia Surf International (6*)
Jul 07 - Jul 12

Winner : Gabriel Medina

Event 22: Macy's E'Series - Ala Moana Bowls, Oahu (1*)
Jul 07 - Jul 12

Event 23: Billabong ECO Surf Festival (5*)
Jul 14 - Jul 19

Event 24: Local Motion Guaraja Surf Pro (5*)
Jul 21 - Jul 26

Event 25: US Open of Surfing (6*)
Jul 17 - Jul 26

Event 26: Tahana Pro (6*)
Jul 28 - Aug 02

Event 27: TBA - Puerto Escondido, Mexico (4*)
Jul 29 - Aug 02

Event 28: Relentless Boardmasters - Newquay, England (5*)
Aug 5 - Aug 9

Event 29: Soöruz Lacanau Pro (6*)
Aug 18 - Aug 23
30th Anniversary of the Lacanau Pro and good conditions this year.
Surf, concerts, events scheduled.
Check out the video for a summary of the event http://vimeo.com/6994555

Event 30: Acores Pro (6*)
Aug 25 - Aug 30

Event 31: Japan Pro Open (3*)
Sep 01 - Sep 06

Event 32: TBA - Zarautz, Basque Country (5*)
Sep 01 - Sep 06

Event 33: Gatorade Surf Classic (3*)
Sep 04 - Sep 06

Event 34: Vans El Ponto Loco (2*)
Sep 09 - Sep 12

Event 35: Sunshine Surfmasters (1*)
Sep 10 - Sep 13

Event 36: TBA - Pantin, Spain (5*)
Sep 08 - Sep 13

Event 37: Buondi Billabong Pro (6*)
Sep 15 - Sep 20

Event 38: Murasaki Pro Kitaizumi (2*)
Sep 16 - Sep 22

Event 39: Oakley NB Pro (2*)
Sep 22 - Sep 27

Event 40: Rio Surf Pro International (6*)
Oct 05 - Oct 11

Event 41: Hyuga Pro (2*)
Oct 07 - Oct 12

Event 42: Onbongo Pro Surfing (6*)
Oct 13 - Oct 18

Event 43: Squalo Mexican Surf Fiesta (1*)
Oct 16 - Oct 18

Event 44: La Caja de Canarias - Ocean & Earth Pro (5*)
Oct 19 - Oct 25

Event 45: O'Neill Coldwater Classic - Canada (6*)
Oct 25 - Oct 31

Event 46: Santa Pro (6P*)
Oct 30 - Nov 07

Winner : Drew Courtney

Event 47: O'Neill Coldwater Classic - California (6P*)
Nov 02 - Nov 08

Event 48: Xcel Pro (4*)
Oct 26 - Nov 10

Event 49: PXM International Vans Pro (3*)
Nov 11 - Nov 15

Event 50: TBA - Papua New Guinea (2*)
Nov 17 - Nov 22

Event 51: Reef Hawaiian Pro (6P*)
Nov 12 - Nov 24

Event 52: O'Neill World Cup of Surfing (6P*)
Nov 25 - Dec 06

World Surf League
2009 in surfing